The 1980 WFA Cup Final was the 10th final of the FA Women's Cup, England's primary cup competition for women's football teams. It was the fifth final to be held under the direct control of Women's Football Association (FA).

Match

Summary

The game ended 1-0 to St Helens.

References

External links
 
 Report at WomensFACup.co.uk

Cup
Women's FA Cup finals
May 1980 sports events in the United Kingdom
1980 sports events in London